Route 100 is a numbered state highway running  in Rhode Island. Route 100's southern terminus is at Route 102 in Glocester and the northern terminus is a continuation as Wallum Lake Road near Douglas, Massachusetts.

Route description
Route 100 takes the following route through the State:
Chepachet (Town of Glocester): ; Route 102 to Burrillville town line
Money Hill Road
Burrillville: ; Glocester town line to Massachusetts State line at Wallum Lake Road
South Main Street, Main Street, Church Street and Wallum Lake Road

Route 100 becomes an unnumbered road (Wallum Lake Road) in Massachusetts.

Major intersections

References

External links

2019 Highway Map, Rhode Island

100
Transportation in Providence County, Rhode Island